The women's individual sabre competition at the 2018 Asian Games in Jakarta, Indonesia was held on 19 August at the Jakarta Convention Center.

Schedule
All times are Western Indonesia Time (UTC+07:00)

Results

Preliminaries

Pool A

Pool B

Pool C

Pool D

Summary

Knockout round

Final

Top half

Bottom half

Final standings

References

External links
Fencing at the 2018 Asian Games - Women's Sabre Individual

Women's Sabre Individual